Mampikony may refer to several places in Madagascar:
 Mampikony, a commune in Mampikony District, Sofia Region.
 Mampikony II, a commune in Mampikony District, Sofia Region.
 Mampikony, a district in Sofia Region.